Angelo Bernard Snipes (born January 11, 1963) is a former American football linebacker in the United States Football League for the Oakland Invaders, and in the National Football League for the Washington Redskins, the San Diego Chargers, and the Kansas City Chiefs.  He later played six seasons in the Canadian Football League for four teams.  He played college football at the University of West Georgia.

1963 births
Living people
American football linebackers
Players of Canadian football from Atlanta
Birmingham Barracudas players
BC Lions players
Canadian football linebackers
Kansas City Chiefs players
Oakland Invaders players
Ottawa Rough Riders players
Players of American football from Atlanta
San Diego Chargers players
West Georgia Wolves football players
Washington Redskins players
Winnipeg Blue Bombers players